Mahmoud Reza Miran Fashandi (born February 25, 1974) more known as Mahmoud Miran was an Iranian judoka.

He finished in joint fifth place in the heavyweight (+100 kg) division at the 2004 Summer Olympics, having lost the bronze medal match to Dennis van der Geest of the Netherlands.

He lost in the first round of 100 kg division in judo during the  2000 Olympics in Sydney, Australia to Frank Möller of Germany.

External links
 Yahoo! Sports
 Persian Judo

1974 births
Living people
Iranian male judoka
Judoka at the 2000 Summer Olympics
Judoka at the 2004 Summer Olympics
Olympic judoka of Iran
Asian Games silver medalists for Iran
Asian Games bronze medalists for Iran
Asian Games medalists in judo
Judoka at the 1994 Asian Games
Judoka at the 1998 Asian Games
Judoka at the 2002 Asian Games
Judoka at the 2006 Asian Games
Islamic Azad University, Central Tehran Branch alumni
Pahlevans of Iran
Medalists at the 1994 Asian Games
Medalists at the 1998 Asian Games
Medalists at the 2002 Asian Games
Medalists at the 2006 Asian Games